Distylium racemosum, the isu tree, is a species of flowering plant in the family Hamamelidaceae. It is native to subtropical eastern Asia; central and southern Japan, the Ryukyu Islands, South Korea (Jeju Island), southeastern China, Taiwan, Hainan, and northern Vietnam. There are a number of cultivars, including 'Guppy' and the variegated 'Akebono'.

References

Hamamelidaceae
Ornamental trees
Garden plants of Asia
Flora of Eastern Asia
Flora of Southeast China
Flora of Hainan
Flora of Vietnam
Plants described in 1841